Andy Penman (20 February 1943 – 19 July 1994) was a Scottish professional footballer, who played for Dundee, Rangers and Arbroath. Penman helped Dundee win the Scottish league championship in 1962. He made four appearances in full internationals for Scotland.

Career
Penman started his career at Everton in 1958 as a 15 year old. He played for the Everton first team twice, against Liverpool in a Floodlit Challenge Trophy match and against a touring South African team. He returned to Scotland later that year with Dundee, and made his first league appearance just before his 16th birthday. Penman was part of the Dundee team that won the Scottish league championship in 1962, and reached the semi-final of the 1962–63 European Cup. He moved to Rangers in 1967 and played there for five seasons. Penman played in two Scottish Cup Finals for Rangers, both of which were lost to Celtic. He left Rangers in 1973 and joined Arbroath. Penman then played for Inverness Caledonian in the Highland League before retiring in 1979.

Penman made his debut international appearance for Scotland in a 3–0 defeat to the Netherlands on 11 May 1966. He made three further appearances during a 1967 overseas tour that the Scottish Football Association decided in October 2021 to reclassify as full internationals, which increased Penman's cap tally from one to four. He also represented the Scottish League XI six times.

Legacy
Penman died in 1994, at the age of 51. There is a lounge at Dundee's Dens Park named in his honour.

References

External links

1943 births
1994 deaths
Association football midfielders
Scotland international footballers
Scottish Football League players
Scottish footballers
Dundee F.C. players
Rangers F.C. players
Arbroath F.C. players
People from Rosyth
Scottish Football League representative players
Caledonian F.C. players
Scotland under-23 international footballers
Highland Football League players
Place of death missing
Everton F.C. players
Footballers from Fife